The men's single sculls rowing competition at the 1980 Summer Olympics took place at Krylatskoye Sports Complex Canoeing and Rowing Basin, Moscow, Soviet Union. The event was held from 20 to 27 July. There were 14 competitors from 14 nations, with each nation limited to a single boat in the event. The event was won by Pertti Karppinen of Finland, his second of three consecutive victories from 1976 to 1984. Karppinen was the eighth man to win multiple medals in the event. Silver went to Vasil Yakusha of the Soviet Union, the nation's sixth medal in eight Games. East Germany took a third consecutive bronze medal, all by different rowers as Peter Kersten was the nation's men's single sculler this Games.

Background

This was the 18th appearance of the event. Rowing had been on the programme in 1896 but was cancelled due to bad weather. The single sculls has been held every time that rowing has been contested, beginning in 1900.

Two of the 15 single scullers from the 1976 Games returned: gold medalist Pertti Karppinen of Finland and ninth-place finisher Hans Svensson of Sweden. Karppinen (also the reigning World Champion) was favoured to repeat, especially with his biggest rival (Peter-Michael Kolbe of West Germany, who had finished second to Karppinen in 1976 and would take two more silver medals in the event in 1984 and 1988) absent due to the American-led boycott. The only rower present with a major international victory was Hugh Matheson of Great Britain, the 1979 Diamond Challenge Sculls winner.

For the second consecutive Games, no nations made their debut in the event. Great Britain made its 15th appearance, most among nations.

Competition format

This rowing event was a single scull event, meaning that each boat was propelled by a single rower. The "scull" portion means that the rower used two oars, one on each side of the boat. The course used the 2000 metres distance that became the Olympic standard in 1912.

The tournament used the four-round format (three main rounds and a repechage) that had been used since 1968. The competition continued to use the six-boat heat standardised in 1960 as well as the "B" final for ranking 7th through 12th place introduced in 1964.

 Quarterfinals: Three heats of 4 or 5 boats each. The top three boats in each heat (9 total) advanced directly to the semifinals. The remaining boats (5 total) went to the repechage.
 Repechage: One heat of 5 boats. The top three boats rejoined the quarterfinal winners in the semifinals. The other boats (2 total) were eliminated.
 Semifinals: Two heats of 6 boats each. The top three boats in each heat (6 total) advanced to Final A, the remaining boats (6 total) went to Final B.
 Final: Two finals. Final A consisted of the top 6 boats. Final B placed boats 7 through 12.

Schedule

All times are Moscow Time (UTC+3)

Results

Quarterfinals

The three fastest rowers in each heat advanced to the semifinals. The remaining rowers competed in the repechage for the remaining spots in the semifinals.

Quarterfinal 1

Quarterfinal 2

Quarterfinal 3

Repechage

The three fastest rowers in the repechage advanced to the semifinals.

Semifinals

The three fastest rowers in each semifinal advanced to Final A, while the others went to Final B.

Semifinal 1

Semifinal 2

Finals

Final B

Final A

Results summary

References

Sources

Rowing at the 1980 Summer Olympics
Men's events at the 1980 Summer Olympics